MDU Wi-Fi, also known as Multiple Dwelling Unit Wi-Fi, Residential Community Wi-Fi, MTU Wi-Fi, Apartment Complex Wi-Fi, Condo Wi-Fi or Timeshare Wi-Fi is the concept of turning an entire Multiple Dwelling Unit (MDU) into a Wi-Fi Hotspot, with the ultimate goal of offering wireless access to the Internet to residents and tenants, as an amenity. This is usually done by providing Internet Access via Wi-Fi to large parts or all of an MDU by deploying wireless access points or a wireless mesh network.  The typical deployment design uses a number of commercial access points outdoors or inside the buildings themselves.  The operator of the network acts as a wireless internet service provider.

Wireless Internet service providers